John Cruickshank (5 July 1787 – 19 November 1875) was a Scottish mathematician.

Life

He was born at Barnhills farm near Rothiemay on 5 July 1787, the son of James Cruickshank (d.1794), a weaver living on the farm. In 1794, on the death of his father, the family moved to be with an aunt at Knowehead farm in Marnoch. His early years were spent as a shepherd boy and he had little education.

From 1803 he studied at Marischal College in Aberdeen and was a Gray bursar. He graduated MA in 1809. In 1814 he did a years Divinity study, supporting himself by working as a private tutor at Haddo House. He then began lecturing in mathematics at Aberdeen.

In 1817 he succeeded Prof Robert Hamilton as Professor of Mathematics.

In 1823 he reduced the students' Christmas vacation from three days to one to improve performance. It is unlikely that this was popular.

Cruickshank also acted as a university administrator and fund-raiser, both with great success. He organised building work in 1821 and was university librarian from 1844 to 1860. In the outside world he was involved in banking and finance and was one of the earliest in Britain to advocate decimalization of currency (on the French basis).

He retired in 1860 but continued to work as a school inspector and to do charitable works.

He died on 19 November 1875 and is buried in the churchyard of the Kirk of St Nicholas. The large tomb lies on the main path from Union Street to the church, close to the entrance.

Family

In 1818 he married Janet Mitchell (1789–1879).

In 1898 his daughter Anne Hamilton Cruickshank (1820–1911) set up a fund in memory of her brother Alexander (1819–1897), and this fund was used to maintain the Botanical Gardens. She also erected a stained glass window in the library of Marischal College in memory of her father. This window was removed in 1970 and placed in storage.

A second son, John Forbes Cruickshank (1823–1842) died young.

References

1787 births
1875 deaths
People from Banffshire
Alumni of the University of Aberdeen
Academics of the University of Aberdeen
Scottish mathematicians